Cruïlles, Monells i Sant Sadurní de l'Heura is a Spanish municipality of the Province of Girona, situated in the comarca (county) of Baix Empordà (Catalonia), formed in 1973 by merging the municipalities of Cruïlles, Monells, and . Sant Sadurní is the capital of the municipality. According to the 2014 census, the municipality has a population of 1,284 inhabitants.

The municipality has the longest toponym in Catalan at 43 characters.

Villages

Places of interest
 Monastery of Sant Miquel de Cruïlles
 Church of Sant Sadurní de l'Heura
 Church of Santa Eulalia de Cruïlles
 Keep of Cruïlles' Castle 
 Church of Sant Genís de Monells
 Church of Sant Joan de Salelles

Demographics

See also
Gavarres

References

External links

 Government data pages 

Municipalities in Baix Empordà